Joe Island is a very small, uninhabited island located in Western Port Bay, Victoria, Australia, approximately 1 km north of French Island.

References

 

Islands of Victoria (Australia)
Western Port
Uninhabited islands of Australia